Record producer Tay Keith has released one studio album, two mixtapes, and one extended play.

Keith released his first mixtape, Foolhardy, with Co Cash in May 2018, followed by his EP Fuxk These N****s Up with Lil Juice in September 2018.

He released the sequel to Fuxk These N****s Up with Lil Juice in November 2019. 

In March 2020, he was featured on Aitch and AJ Tracey's single "Rain", which peaked at number three on the UK Singles Chart. In May 2020, he released his debut studio album with Fast Cash Boyz, titled Fxck the Cash Up.

Collaborative albums

Mixtapes

Extended plays

Singles

As lead artist

As featured artist

Other charted songs

Guest appearances

References 

Production discographies
Hip hop discographies